The Bureau of Information Resource Management (IRM) is a component of Department of State's management family of bureaus, which provides the information technology and services the Department needs to successfully carry out its foreign policy mission.

IRM is divided into two constituent groups, Operations (OPS) and Business, Planning, and Customer Service (BPC).  Among the tasks assigned IRM's branches and divisions are deployment and maintenance of a global network supporting more than 250 overseas diplomatic missions sending nearly six million official messages (sometimes called cables in reference to the long-employed telegraphic means of transmission).  IRM staffers also support desktop users, code software, assure the security of information resources, and develop long-term strategic plans for the use of information technologies in the mission of diplomacy.

The bureau is headed by the Department of State's Chief Information Officer (CIO).

References

External links

IRM